The Battle of Long Island refers to a collegiate sports rivalry between the Hofstra Pride and the Stony Brook Seawolves, who both are located on Long Island. Hofstra University is the largest private university on Long Island and is located in Hempstead, New York in Nassau County, while Stony Brook University is the largest public university in the state of New York by area and is located in Suffolk County. Since 2022, both schools have been members of the Colonial Athletic Association, with Stony Brook playing in the America East Conference from 2001 to 2022.

Until the merger of the LIU Brooklyn and LIU Post athletic programs into the singular LIU Sharks program in 2019, Hofstra and Stony Brook represented the only Division I universities located on Long Island. The two schools are separated by a distance of 28 miles (45 km).

The sports rivalry has traditionally revolved around men's basketball, which was the first meeting between the two schools in 1973. Hofstra first fielded a basketball team in 1935 and joined the East Coast Conference in 1974 when the NCAA created the Division I classification. Stony Brook first fielded a basketball team in 1960 but remained at the Division III level before elevating to Division I in 1999.

Hofstra leads the all-time series 24–6. Hofstra leads the series 13–5 since both schools became Division I in 1999.

The two schools used to play each other every year in football from 1984 to 1990 and 2004 to 2009 as well before Hofstra eliminated its football program in 2009. When Hofstra dropped football, Stony Brook became the only Division I football team on Long Island until the LIU Post football team, previously Division II, became the D-I LIU team.

Men's basketball

History 
Hofstra and Stony Brook first faced off in 1973, with Hofstra winning 103–80. The two schools played every year from 1973 to 1975 before taking a six-year break and playing one game in 1981 and two games in 1982. Then, the matchup did not happen until 1985, when Stony Brook won its first Battle of Long Island 86–75 after Hofstra won all of the first six games. It was the only meeting until 1993. From 1973 to 1997, when Hofstra was in Division I and Stony Brook was in Division III or II, Hofstra won the series 11–1.

Stony Brook moved to Division I in 1999. In the late 1990s, Hofstra was led by head coach Jay Wright, who went on to even greater success at Villanova before retiring in the 2022 offseason, and won back-to-back America East titles at the turn of the century. Future first-round NBA draft pick Speedy Claxton would reach a career-high game with 13 assists in one Battle of Long Island matchup. Upon Hofstra's departure from the America East to the CAA, Stony Brook would take one of the vacant spots in Hofstra's former conference.

Stony Brook won the Battle of Long Island three times in the 2000s, but the rivalry was halted after 2008 and resumed in 2014. Upon the resumption, Hofstra has owned the rivalry again. Jameel Warney scored 22 points to give Stony Brook a 71–68 win in 2015, but then Hofstra won the next six games, including a 96–58 beatdown in 2016. In 2017 Justin Wright-Foreman, who would be drafted by the Utah Jazz in the second round of the 2019 NBA Draft, scored 33 points to give Hofstra an 84–81 comeback win. Stony Brook snapped a five-game losing streak in the series with a 79–62 win in 2021.

Game results

Football 
Hofstra and Stony Brook played each other in football every season from 1984 to 1990 and from 2004 to 2009, when Hofstra eliminated its football program. Hofstra beat Stony Brook in all 13 of its contests together, often in blowout fashion.

Following the dissolution of Hofstra's football program, running backs Miguel Maysonet and Brock Jackolski both transferred to Stony Brook. Maysonet would become Stony Brook's all-time leading rusher, the 2011 and 2012 Big South Conference Offensive Player of the Year and the runner-up for the 2012 Walter Payton Award behind Old Dominion quarterback Taylor Heinicke, given to the top FCS player in the country. Jackolski would become Stony Brook's fifth all-time leading rusher. He rushed for 1,418 yards in 2011, third-most in a single season at Stony Brook, in the same year that Maysonet ran for 1,633 yards, the second-most in a single season. Maysonet's 1,964 rushing yards in 2012 is the program's single-season record.

Game results

Other sports

Women's basketball 
Precise date and location data does not exist for many of the earliest contests.

Men's soccer

Women's soccer
Current Stony Brook women's soccer head coach Tobias Bischof was hired after spending eight seasons as an assistant coach at Hofstra.

Men's lacrosse

Women's lacrosse

Footnotes

References 

Hofstra Pride
Stony Brook Seawolves
College sports rivalries in the United States
College basketball rivalries in the United States